Phaeoura perfidaria is a species of moth in the family Geometridae (geometrid moths). It was described by William Barnes and James Halliday McDunnough in 1917 and is found in North America, where it has been recorded from Arizona, California, Colorado and New Mexico.

The wingspan is 40–47 mm.

The MONA or Hodges number for Phaeoura perfidaria is 6768.

References

Further reading
 Arnett, Ross H. (2000). American Insects: A Handbook of the Insects of America North of Mexico. CRC Press.
 Scoble, Malcolm J., ed. (1999). Geometrid moths of the World: A Catalogue (Lepidoptera, Geometridae). 1016.

External links
Butterflies and Moths of North America

Geometridae
Moths described in 1917